Park Street is a small Hertfordshire village near St Albans in England; it is separated from the latter by a buffer to the north.  

Park Street has a petrol station, several tyre and automotive service businesses and two food-serving public houses; it is of late and initially disparate medieval origin. The village is also home to the penultimate station on the Abbey Line from Watford Junction, which opened in 1858.

Park Street is also a larger local government ward (the largest settlement of which is How Wood and which includes part of Bricket Wood).  The area falls within the Metropolitan Green Belt.  Residents are mainly employed in nearby cities; east of the street in Frogmore is a substantial business centre and light industrial estate.

Location
Park Street is approximately 2½ miles by road from St Albans via Watling Street (the old Roman road from London to Chester and Holyhead) and then a post-Roman offshoot, St Stephen's Hill, into the medieval city centre.

Just south of the A405/A414 North Orbital Road, Hertfordshire which has a direct spur to the M25 (J21A) and Watford, the A405, road links and rail links are within the village boundaries.

The A405, A414, A5183 (formerly A5, Watling Street) and the former M10 motorway (now numbered as part of the A414 as of 1 May 2009), join at Park Street Roundabout.

To the east and south-east of the village lies the disused Handley Page aerodrome.

Origin of the name 
It is thought unlikely the name 'Park' comes from the usual meaning of an enclosure of land for the purpose of hunting but rather simply designates an enclosure of some kind, derived from the Saxon word for enclosure which is  ‘pearroc’.

The village lies on the Roman Road of Watling Street which forms the main street and continued as a trunk route for travellers going to and from the north from London during Saxon and Norman times.

History 
The immediate village has fourteen heritage-listed buildings, one of which on Watling Street is half-timbered – the majority of the rest being brick built early Victorian buildings –  although Toll Cottage on Bury Dell just to the east is 17th century. Most significant to this area would have been the passing trade for villagers to sell ale and produce along Watling Street, and easy access to the markets in St Albans.

Queen Elizabeth I's spy master Sir Francis Walsingham lived at nearby Old Parkbury, south of the village which was the manor house.

There used to be a Sub Post-Office and more shops, however many of these have closed as both How Wood and St Albans provide a larger range of shops.

Landmarks
The main landmark in the village is a mill, which was converted into offices in 1984. During the conversion, a World War II bomb was found in the "Old Smithy's" garden.

There is a village hall, accessed from the A5183. Opened in 1936, it operates as the polling station when required.

Park Street Baptist Church is in Penn Road.

Railway station

Park Street railway station is the first station after St Albans Abbey on the Abbey Line. The railway was built in 1858 as a branch line from the London & Birmingham Railway, and Park Street station has been on its current site since 1890. Before being moved to its current position, on Watling Street, it was situated just near Hyde Lane off Park Street Lane, near the current How Wood station.

There was another railway line, built in 1866, which linked the above London & North Western Railway branch line to St Albans, to the newly constructed Midland Main Line from Bedford to St Pancras at Napsbury. It was a goods line in brief use but closed by 1910, called the Park Street Branch and was operated by the Midland Railway. 
The railway bridge near Sycamore Drive was demolished around 1948 after being damaged by a giant propeller being delivered to the Handley Page aircraft works. It is still possible to see some of the bridge brickwork here which is just by The Overdraught pub. Another, over the River Ver at the back of Sycamore Drive, still survives. Beyond the bridge over the River Ver this line crossed what became the Handley Page aircraft factory runway. This runway was in use until the mid-1960s for the maintenance and testing of the V bomber fleet.

A 1960s metal bridge carries the Abbey Line trains, sometimes affectionately dubbed the Abbey Flyer, over the main road, replacing a previous brick one.

Schools
Park Street has two primary schools: Park Street Church of England Primary School, and How Wood Primary School.

The nearest secondary school is Marlborough School.

Public houses

There are now two pubs in the village: The Falcon, and The Overdraught (which used to be called The White Horse). There were previously seven other pubs in Park Street/Frogmore/Colney Street: The Red Lion closed in 2009, and The Swan closed in 2008. In Frogmore, The Red Cow closed in 2001/02, and The Lamb closed in the early 1970s. In Colney, The Black Horse was demolished in 2003; The George and Dragon closed in the early 1990s and The Jolly Farmer, closed in the 1930s.

Until the early 1970s, The Lamb was situated opposite the entrance to the Handley Page aircraft factory (now Frederick Place). Once the factory closed the pub became uneconomic to run and, so legend has it (widely-held story in the village at the time), the landlord and his wife closed the pub, locked themselves in and drank the pub dry before being ordered out by the brewery. The pub's building still exists as a private residence, divided into three flats.

The Falcon is reputed to be on the site of a "Pilgrim's Rest", which was a series of places used to house the pilgrims to St Alban's shrine.

Parks and sport
Park Street has three parks:
Recreation Ground by sports fields on Park Street Lane: Park Street Football Club and the cricket (sport) ground and pavilion.
Mayflower Road Park
Frogmore Lakes Park, to the south of the village just past the gravel pits, popular for fishing.
There was also a large park along Burydell/ Bury Dell Lane; replaced by the vegetable allotments, this was in use at least until 1900.

Notes

References

External links

Villages in Hertfordshire
City of St Albans